British Coal Corporation v Smith [1996] IRLR 404 is a UK labour law case, concerning equal pay.

Facts
Three collective agreements covered canteen, clerical and surface mineworkers who were British Coal employees. All, however, had pay and conditions set through a centralised industry level agreement. The mineworkers got production extra bonuses, varying locally. The female canteen and clerical workers claimed they were being unequally paid. They did not get a coal bonus, but got everything else.

The Tribunal held that the bonuses were ‘locally varied fulfilment of the same universally accepted central terms’.

Judgment

Court of Appeal
Balcombe LJ [1994] ICR 810 overturned this, arguing under the Equal Pay Act 1970 section 1(6) that conditions needed to be the same if one chose a comparator at a different establishment - and not broadly or essentially similar terms.

House of Lords
Lord Slynn restored the tribunal, saying, ‘the terms and conditions do not have to be identical’, just ‘substantially comparable’. Otherwise it would be ‘far too restrictive’.

See also
UK employment equality law

Defrenne v Sabena (No 2) [1976] ECR 455 (C-43/75) ECJ held that TFEU art 157 required equal pay ‘for equal work which is carried out in the same establishment or service whether private or public’. But this was later reduced.
Macarthys Ltd v Smith (No 2) [1981] QB 180, successful comparison with someone who preceded the claimant in employment
Diocese of Hallam Trustees v Connaughton [1996] ICR 860 (EAT), successful comparison with someone who succeeded the claimant in employment
South Ayrshire Council v Morton [2002] ICR 956, Court of Session held it was permissible for a teacher in one local authority to compare herself with a teacher in another
Lawrence v Regent Office Care Ltd [2002] IRLR 822, [2002] ECR I-07325, (2002) C-320/00, a single source is held to be implicitly necessary to correct pay discrimination

Notes

References

United Kingdom labour case law
House of Lords cases
1996 in case law
1996 in British law